Mapperton is a hamlet and civil parish in Dorset, England,  south-east of Beaminster. Dorset County Council estimated that the population of the parish was 60 in 2013.

Parish
The population has always been low, rising to a peak of 123 in 1821, before falling to 76 in 1901 and 50 in 1931. After the Second World War it dropped further; only 21 residents remained in 1961.

Listed as Malperetone in the Domesday Book, the name means "farmstead where maple trees grow".

Mapperton House
Mapperton is noted for its manor house, with both house and gardens open to the public during the summer months. The house is Grade I listed, as is the attached All Saints' Church which dates from the 12th century.

The manor had been owned since the 11th century by only four families (Brett, Morgan, Brodrepp, Compton), all linked by the female line, before it was sold to Ethel Labouchere in 1919. When she died in 1955 it was acquired by Victor Montagu, Viscount Hinchingbrooke. When he died in 1995 it passed to his son, The 11th Earl of Sandwich.

Robert Morgan built a Tudor manor on the present site in the 1540s, and part of it remains as the north wing of the present building. The house was largely rebuilt in the 1660s by Richard Brodrepp, with the addition of the hall and west front, as well as the dovecote and stable blocks. A second Richard Brodrepp created the Georgian staircase in the 18th century. In 2006 the house was voted the "Nation's Finest Manor House" by Country Life magazine.

The tomb of Richard Brodrepp in the church dates from 1739 and was designed by Peter Scheemakers.

The grounds and formal gardens are Grade II* listed. An Italianate garden laid was out in the 1920s and a wild garden in the 1950s. In 2020, the gardens were named Historic Houses Garden of the Year. The house is run by Viscount and Viscountess Hinchingbrooke. In January 2023, they announced plans to open the house for a limited number of private tours.

Gallery

Filming location
The manor house was used in the filming of the 1996 film Emma, in which it became Randalls, the home of Mrs Weston; the 1997 BBC version of The History of Tom Jones; and the 2015 version of Thomas Hardy's Far from the Madding Crowd. The manor was used again in Rebecca as Manderley's garden, which is open to the public from Spring to Autumn.

References

External links

 Mapperton House – official site

Civil parishes in Dorset
Hamlets in Dorset